Maximum Security may refer to:
 Supermax, "control-unit" prisons, or units within prisons
 Maximum Security (comics), a comic book miniseries published by Marvel Comics 
 Maximum Security (Tony MacAlpine album), 1987
 Maximum Security (Alien Sex Fiend album), 1985
 Maximum Security (TV series), an American drama television series on HBO
 "Maximum Security" (Brooklyn Nine-Nine), a television episode
 Maximum Security (novel), the third book of the CHERUB series
 Maximum Security (horse) (foaled 2016), American racehorse
 Prison Tycoon 2: Maximum Security, a 2006 computer game

See also 
 Supermax (disambiguation)
 Maximum security prison